Simon Vollant (1 February 1622 – 1694) was a 17th-century French engineer, entrepreneur and architect ennobled in 1685.

Vollant built the citadel of Lille and became the most renowned fortifications builder for Vauban, Louvois and Louis XIV. He directed or controlled the principal works of fortifications of the cities, inspected the various fortresses of the north of the country and advised the generals.

He drew the plans of the new district Saint-André de Lille. His advice was sought and followed for the channelling works of the Deûle and to bring the waters of the Eure to Versailles.

Biography 

Vollant came from an old Lille family of entrepreneurs and architects, then called "master masons".

In 1646, Simon Vollant is indicated as "master mason" having several apprentices. He was dean of the master masons every year from 1648 to 1659, the year when his brother François succeeded him in this title.

Citadels and fortresses 

In 1667, Vollant directed the construction site of the citadel of Lille according to the plans of Vauban. The collaboration between the two men was exemplary.

The town had to be enlarged, and Vauban imagined financing part of the fortification work by the added value realised on the land of the new district. Vollant estimated this gain at over 800,000 French livres, an estimate confirmed by the intendant. For the construction of the citadel, he employed 6,000 workers and reported to Vauban and to Louvois. On the recommendation of Marshal d'Humières, Vollant was appointed engineer to the king and ordinary architect of his armies, in reward for his services, according to a letter from Louvois of April 1668.

Simon Vollant drew the plans for the new district of Saint-André, on a very regular basis, around two main streets, the other streets being perpendicular to each other. This district, under construction from 1670, became the "Faubourg Saint-Germain" of Lille, with numerous hôtels particuliers. At the same time, he was responsible for building the new defensive wall of Lille, from 1671 to 1676, again after plans by Vauban.

During the Franco-Dutch War, Vollant's opinions were sought during the war councils preparing the strongholds attacks, and "his favourably listened opinions did not contribute little to the taking of these places", according to Louis XIV.

The king then chose Vollant to control the work on the fortified towns of Courtrai, Ath and Bergues, and inspect the towns and places of Douai, the fort of Escarpe, Audenarde, Halle, Tournai, Arras and Ypres.

Then Vollant directed the work of the fortifications of Menen, in liaison with Louvois, and to the satisfaction of the king.

The Porte de Paris 

Vollant was also in demand for civil architecture. He determined the means of digging the canal from the Deûle to the Scarpe, and gave his opinions "approved as necessary" to bring the waters of the Eure into the palace of Versailles.

To celebrate the return to France of Lille and the Walloon Flanders, on order from Louvois and Louis XIV, Vollant transformed from 1685 to 1694 the Porte de Paris (then called the "gate of the Sick"), in triumphal arch.

The plan he made was approved in September 1684 by Louis XIV and Louvois. The work on the triumphal arch was carried out in stages, according to financial possibilities, and was not completed until about 1695, one year after Vollant's death.

The Porte de Paris thus answered more to imperatives of prestige than to any military concern. It was decorated with large doric columns, trophies and statues. But the gate itself was only a small opening following the draw-bridge, which still gave the whole a defensive role, and made it considered as "one of the last masterpieces of military history".

Other works 

Vollant was also responsible for the design and construction in 1687 of the houses of the "Rang de Beauregard" (or Rang de Beau regard) on the Place du Théâtre in Lille. The harmonization imposed by the city included alignment rules, a two-storey plan with a mansarded attic and a large cellar, all built only in dimension stones and bricks. Vollant respected these rules and made a synthesis between the French classical architecture of the time and the local Flemish architecture.

He also drew the plans for the Hôtel de Métilly, rue du Gros-Gérard, which was completed in 1695, one year after his death.

He was also appointed Grand Argentier (treasurer) of Lille from 1671, which displeased Lille residents who considered it abnormal that their treasurer was at the same time, by his status as director of fortifications or contractor, one of the main spenders. He was then prosecutor of the Magistrate of Lille, from 1684.

Some authors also attribute to Vollant the beginning of the construction of the Pont-Neuf de Lille completed in 1701 and of various later works, the general hospital, the Palace of Justice and the Archives, which would rather be attributed to his sons, having been built and completed after his death.

Coat of arms 

He was ennobled in 1685. The rules of heraldry accompanying his letters of nobility attributed to him the arms  This were canting arms with the semi-vols for "Vollant".

Family 
Vollant married Marie Villain, originally from Tournai, daughter of André Villain, dean of the master masons (architects) of Tournai.

 Their children were:
 François Pasquier Vollant, received as master mason (architect) in 1656.
 Jean François Vollant, received like his brother as master mason in 1656.
 Jean Vollant.
 Marie-Jeanne Vollant.

Vollant married Marguerite-Félicité Haccou for a second marriage.

Homages 
 Ennoblement in 1685.
 Plaque on the citadel of Lille: Louis le Grand la voulut / Vauban la dessina / Simon Vollant l'édifia.
 Place Simon-Vollant, in Lille, place where is located the Gate of Paris that he built.
 Rue Simon-Vollant in Lambersart.

Notes and references 
 L. Quarré-Reybourbon, La porte de Paris, à Lille, et Simon Vollant son architecte, Paris, Plon, 1891 Read online

 Other references and notes

Bibliography 
 L. Quarré-Reybourbon, La porte de Paris, à Lille, et Simon Vollant son architecte, Paris, Plon, 1891 Read online.
 .
 .
  Read online.
 Louis de Grandmaison, Essai d'armorial des artistes français. Lettres de noblesse. Preuves pour l'ordre de Saint-Michel, Réunion des sociétés savantes des départements à la Sorbonne. Section des beaux-arts. Ministère de l'instruction publique, 1903, 27th session Read online

External links 
 Simon Vollant on Structurae

French military engineers
French urban planners
18th-century French architects
1622 births
People from Lille
1694 deaths